Konstantin Ognjanović (Serbian Cyrillic: Константин Огњановић; born 5 May 1973) is a Serbian former football player.

During his career he played for FK Budućnost Podgorica, Red Star Belgrade, FK Zemun, FK Vojvodina, FK Milicionar, OFK Beograd, mostly in First League of FR Yugoslavia, and since January 2000, in Germany, with Greuther Fürth, playing in the 2. Bundesliga, and 1. FC Union Berlin in the Regionalliga Nord.

External links
 Proifle at Greuther Fuerth site.
 Konstantin  Ognjanovic at immerunioner.de
 

1973 births
Living people
Footballers from Belgrade
Serbian footballers
Serbian expatriate footballers
FK Budućnost Podgorica players
Red Star Belgrade footballers
FK Zemun players
FK Vojvodina players
FK Milicionar players
OFK Beograd players
SpVgg Greuther Fürth players
1. FC Union Berlin players
Expatriate footballers in Germany
Association football forwards